Abu Mohammed Abdellah Ibn Mohammed Al-Azdi (ca. ? - 1033 CE), known also as Ibn Al-Thahabi or Ibn al-Zahabi was an Arab physician, famous for writing the first known alphabetical encyclopedia of medicine.

Biography
He was born in Suhar, Oman. He moved then into Basra, then to Persia where he studied under Al-Biruni and Ibn Sina. Later he migrated to Jerusalem and finally settled in Valencia, in Al-Andalus (Islamic Spain).

Works
He is famous for his book Kitab Al-Ma'a (The Book of Water),  a medical encyclopedia that lists the names of diseases, medicines,  physiological processes, and treatments. It is the first known alphabetical classification of medical terms. In this encyclopedia, Ibn Al-Thahabi not only lists the names but adds numerous original ideas about the function of the human organs.  The book also contains an array of herbal treatments and a course for the treatment psychological symptoms. The main thesis is that cure must start from controlled food and exercise;  if it persists then use specific individual medicines;  if it still persists then use medical compounds; and if the disease continues, surgery is performed.

References

See also
List of Arab scientists and scholars
Islamic scholars
Islamic medicine

Physicians from al-Andalus
11th-century physicians
11th-century Arabs
Azd
11th-century Omani people